Calosoma cancellatum is a species of ground beetle in the subfamily of Carabinae. It was described by Eschscholtz in 1833.

References

cancellatum
Beetles described in 1833